The Center for Intellectual Property Studies (CIP) is a development center at the intersection of industry and academia. Founded in a joint effort between Chalmers University of Technology and School of Business, Economics, and Law at the University of Gothenburg, both in Gothenburg, Sweden, CIP is an actor in the area of intellectual property and entrepreneurship.

See also
Intellectual property organization

External links
Official web site

Intellectual property organizations
University of Gothenburg
Joint ventures
Chalmers University of Technology